Players in the Gallery is a 1980 mini series about a lawyer who divorces his wife.

References

External links
Players in the Gallery at IMDb

1980s Australian television miniseries
1980 Australian television series debuts
1980 Australian television series endings
1980 television films
1980 films
English-language television shows